Golyanovo District is a district of Eastern Administrative Okrug of the federal city of Moscow, Russia. Population:  

It is one of the largest districts in Moscow, both in terms of the geographic area and population size. Located 9-15 km to the east of the Kremlin, this large territory is bounded by MKAD (Moscow Automobile Ring Road), Shchyolkovskoye Shosse, and the national park "Losiny Ostrov".

Golyanovo is named after minnow (golyan in Russian), which was once abundant in the local lakes. The first mention of Golyanovo dates back to the 17th century. Golyanovo was incorporated into the city of Moscow in the early 1960s. At approximately the same time, city officials started massive construction projects in the district, building numerous microdistricts.

References

Districts of Moscow
Eastern Administrative Okrug